Big Spring Historic District is a national historic district located at Van Buren, Carter County, Missouri.  It encompasses 26 contributing buildings, 1 contributing site, and contributing structure in the Ozark National Scenic Riverways. It includes the Big Spring, rental cabins, service building, storage shed, garage, a museum, dining lodge, restroom, shelter house, ranger station, pump house, footbridge, and two picnic shelters.  The structures represent the best features of park construction by the Civilian Conservation Corps in Missouri.

It was listed on the National Register of Historic Places in 1981.

References

Civilian Conservation Corps in Missouri
Historic districts on the National Register of Historic Places in Missouri
Buildings and structures in Carter County, Missouri
National Register of Historic Places in Carter County, Missouri